Hadar Cars (born 13 June 1933) is a Swedish liberal politician who served as the minister of commerce and industry between 1978 and 1979. He also served in the Swedish Parliament and European Parliament.

Biography
Cars was born in Stockholm on 13 June 1933. He headed the Nordic Liberal Student Council. Cars is a member of the Liberals. He was appointed minister of commerce and industry in October 1978 to the cabinet led by Prime Minister Ola Ullsten. His tenure ended in October 1979. Cars served at the Parliament between 1985 and 1995. During his term at the Parliament he was the chairman of the international committee of the Liberals. Cars was elected to the European Parliament in 1995 and served there as part of the European Liberal, Democrat and Reform Party until 1999.

Works and awards
Cars is the author of various articles and books which are concerned with the energy, finance policy and the European Union. He received the ribbon of the Order of the Seraphim in 1999.

References

External links

20th-century Swedish writers
21st-century Swedish writers
1933 births
Members of the Riksdag from the Liberals (Sweden)
Living people
Swedish Ministers for Trade
Liberals (Sweden) MEPs
Politicians from Stockholm
MEPs for Sweden 1995–1999
Members of the Riksdag 1985–1988
Members of the Riksdag 1988–1991
Members of the Riksdag 1991–1994